Yōzō, Yozo or Youzou is a masculine Japanese given name.

Possible writings
Yōzō can be written using different combinations of kanji characters. Here are some examples:

洋三, "ocean, 3"
洋蔵, "ocean, store up"
洋造, "ocean, create"
陽三, "sunshine, 3"
陽蔵, "sunshine, store up"
陽造, "sunshine, create"
容三, "contain, 3"
容蔵, "contain, store up"
容造, "contain, create"
葉三, "leaf, 3"
葉蔵, "leaf, store up"
曜三, "weekday,3"
曜蔵, "weekday, store up"
要三, "essential, 3"
用蔵, "utilize, store up"
蓉三, "lotus, 3"
蓉蔵, "lotus, store up"
庸三, "common, 3"

The name can also be written in hiragana ようぞう or katakana ヨウゾウ.

Notable people with the name
, Japanese footballer
, Japanese politician 
, Japanese mathematician
, Japanese mayor
, Japanese samurai of the late Edo period
Yozo Yokota (横田 洋三, 1940–2019), Japanese lawyer

Japanese masculine given names